Mobilise is a set of Christian conferences, weekend retreats and resources for students and twenties, run by the Newfrontiers family of churches in the UK.

Mobilise Conference
The main Mobilise event is an annual conference which has been attended by over 1600 students and twenties. The 4 day conference was held during the summer, often in July, at the Brighton Centre in Brighton, England, alongside the Together On A Mission conference for Christian leaders.

At the final Together On A Mission conference in July 2011, it was announced that the Mobilise conference would continue independently in the coming years. The 2012 conference will be held at a Pontins holiday park in Prestatyn, Wales.

Other Endeavours

Leaders' Weekends
Mobilise runs student and twenties workers' retreats.

Mobilise Worldwide
Mobilise also supports international missions, sending out two teams a year during the Easter and summer holidays.

Resources
Mobilise also provides support for Christians attending and graduating university.

See also
Newfrontiers
Together On A Mission
Newday

References

External links
 Mobilise official website

Newfrontiers
Evangelical Christian conferences
British New Church Movement